This is a list of the extreme points of the Netherlands, the points that are farther up, down, north, south, east or west than any other location.

European part of the Netherlands
Northernmost Point — Rottumerplaat
Northernmost Point (mainland) — Noordkaap
Southernmost Point — boundary marker 12 along Rue de Beusdael, near Kuttingen in the municipality of Gulpen-Wittem, Limburg
Westernmost Point — Sint Anna ter Muiden
Easternmost Point — Bad Nieuweschans
Highest Point — Vaalserberg (322.7 m above sea level)
Lowest point — Zuidplaspolder near Nieuwerkerk aan den IJssel (6.76 m below sea level)

Netherlands
When in the list above the special municipalities in the Caribbean are included, the western- and southernmost points change to locations on the island Bonaire, whereas the highest point is on the island Saba. The approximate locations are:
Westernmost Point — west of Lake Goto
Southernmost Point — Willemstoren Lighthouse Bonaire
Highest Point — Mount Scenery (887 m above sea level)

Kingdom of the Netherlands
When all countries of the Kingdom of the Netherlands are taken into account, the southernmost point moves to Curaçao and the westernmost point moves to Aruba.
Southernmost Point — Klein Curaçao, Curaçao
Westernmost Point — Divi village, Aruba

See also 
Extreme points of Earth
Geography of the Netherlands

Gallery

External links 
Most northern point on the continent of the Netherlands

Geography of the Netherlands
Lists of coordinates
Netherlands
Extreme